Marko Jošilo (born 16 October 1992) is a Serbian-Bosnian professional basketball player for Igokea of the Bosnian League and the Adriatic League. He signed a two-year deal with Igokea on June 18, 2020.

References

External links 
 Profile at aba-liga.com
 Profile at eurobasket.com

Living people
1992 births
ABA League players
Basketball League of Serbia players
Bosnia and Herzegovina men's basketball players
KK Bosna Royal players
KK Igokea players
KK Krka players
KK Metalac Valjevo players
KK Partizan players
KK Radnik Bijeljina players
Serbian expatriate basketball people in Bosnia and Herzegovina
Serbian expatriate basketball people in Slovenia
Serbian men's basketball players
Small forwards